The Băiaș is a left tributary of the river Olt in Romania. It discharges into the Olt in Copăceni.

Tributaries

The following rivers are tributaries to the river Băiaș (from source to mouth):

Left: Grebla, Roșia, Pârâul Șasei, Pârâul Posăzii, Pârâul Starului, Șasa, Călugăreasa, Piatra Acră, Mocirlele
Right: Râușorul, Frumușița, Dosul, Valea Stogului

References

Rivers of Romania
Rivers of Vâlcea County